Demerara-Mahaica (Region 4) is a region of Guyana, bordering the Atlantic Ocean to the north, the region of Mahaica-Berbice to the east, the region of Upper Demerara-Berbice to the south and the region of Essequibo Islands-West Demerara to the west.

It contains the country's capital Georgetown. Notable villages in the region include Buxton, Enmore, Victoria and Paradise.

Population
The Government of Guyana has administered three official censuses since the 1980 administrative reforms, in 1980, 1991 and 2002. Even though this administrative region is the smallest, it has the largest population out of all Guyana's Administrative Regions. In 2012, the population of Demerara-Mahaica was recorded at 313,429 people. Official census records for the population of the Demerara-Mahaica region are as follows:

2012 : 313,429
2002 : 310,320
1991 : 296,924
1980 : 317,475

Communities
With name variants in parenthesis.

Ann's Grove
Agricola Village
Alberttown (ward of Georgetown)
Albouystown (ward of Georgetown)
Alexander Village (Alexanderville)
Annandale
Bagotstown
Beehive
Bel Air (Gardens / Park / Springs) (wards of Georgetown)
Belfield (Belfield Village)
Beterverwagting (Betterverwagting)
Better Hope
Bourda
Buxton
Campbelville
Cane Grove
Charlestown (ward of Georgetown)
Clonbrook
Cove and John
Craig
Zeeland
De Kinderen (De Kindern)
Enmore
Enterprise
Georgetown
Glasgow (Glasgow Village)
Good Intent
Great Diamond
Helena
Houston
Hyde Park
Jonestown (Voorzigtigheid)
Kingston, Guyana
Kitty (ward of Georgetown)
Kuru Kururu
La Penitence (ward of Georgetown)
Lacytown (ward of Georgetown)
Lamaha Gardens
Land of Canaan
Little Diamond
Lodge (Lodge Village)
Lusignan
Mahaica Village
Mon Repos
Nabacalis (Nabaclis)
New Burg (Newburg)
New Haven
Newtown (ward of Georgetown)
Non Pariel (Nonpareil)
Paradise
Plaisance (Plaisance Village)
Prashad Nagar
Providence
Queenstown (ward of Georgetown)
Silver Hill
Soesdyke (Soesdyk)
Stabroek
St. Cuthbert's Mission (Pakuri, St. Cuthbert's)
Subryanville
Timehri
Triumph
Unity
Victoria
Vigilance
Werk-en-rust
Wortmanville

See also

References

 
Regions of Guyana